Shaun Myles Meachem (born October 9, 1979 in Edmonton, Alberta) is a Canadian curler from Cabri, Saskatchewan.

Curling career 
Meachem grew up in Mayerthorpe, Alberta. He played on a number of teams in Alberta before moving to Saskatchewan in 2009. While in Alberta, Meachem won two World Curling Tour events: the Rainbow Cashspiel in 2004, playing lead for Rob Armitage and again in 2005 playing second for Chris Schille.

After moving to Saskatchewan, Meachem began curling competitively again in 2012, playing third for Max Kirkpatrick. Meachem played in his first Saskatchewan men's provincial at the 2013 SaskTel Tankard, but the Kirkpatrick rink would not make the playoffs. The next season, they again failed to make the playoffs at the 2014 SaskTel Tankard.

Meachem won the 2014 Saskatchewan Mixed Curling Championship with teammates Kelly Wood, Carl deConinck Smith and Kelsey Dutton. They represented the province at the 2014 Canadian Mixed Curling Championship, losing to Ontario's Cory Heggestad in the semifinal.

In 2014 Meachem joined the Drew Heidt rink, throwing fourth stones for the team. They would win one WCT event that season, winning the BV Inn Curling Classic. 
At the 2015 SaskTel Tankard the team would miss the playoffs.

In 2015 Meachem formed his own team as skip, with teammates Catlin Schneider, Brady Scharback and Aaron Shutra. The team would win two WCT events in their first season together, the HDF Insurance Shoot-Out and the Medicine Hat Charity Classic. The team went all the way to the finals of the 2016 SaskTel Tankard, where they lost to Steve Laycock. The team qualified for Meachem's first Grand Slam of Curling event, the season-ending 2016 Humpty's Champions Cup.

In 2017, Meachem, along with teammates Adam Casey, Catlin Schneider, and Dustin Kidby defeated Steve Laycock to win the 2017 SaskTel Tankard. Meachem represented Saskatchewan at the 2017 Tim Hortons Brier, where they finished with a 5-6 record.

In 2018, Meachem formed a new team, playing third with teammates Dustin Kalthoff, Bryaden Stewart, and Jared Latos. The team curls out of the Nutana Curling Club in Saskatoon, Saskatchewan.

Personal life
Meachem is the owner of Meach Construction Ltd. He is married to Marla Phillips and has three children.

References

External links

Living people
Curlers from Saskatchewan
People from Lac Ste. Anne County
Canadian male curlers
1979 births
Curlers from Edmonton